HMS Harwich was a 50-gun fourth rate ship of the line of the Royal Navy, built at King's Yard in Harwich by John Barnard to the dimensions laid down in the 1741 proposals of the 1719 Establishment at Harwich, and launched on 22 December 1743.

Her captain, William Adams, was killed in 1748 during Edward Boscawen's unsuccessful siege of Pondicherry during the War of the Austrian Succession.

At some point around in 1757 or shortly before, Harwich captured the Maria Louisa Magdalena, Messagere, and Comte de Maurepas.

In 1758 she participated in the British Capture of Senegal, captained by Commodore Henry Marsh.

Harwich was wrecked in 1760.

Notes

References

Lavery, Brian (2003) The Ship of the Line – Volume 1: The development of the battlefleet 1650–1850. Conway Maritime Press. .

Ships of the line of the Royal Navy
1743 ships
Ships built in Harwich
Maritime incidents in 1760